Robbie Merrill (born June 13, 1963) is an American bassist, best known as a founding member of Godsmack and Another Animal. He was featured in the Behind the Player interactive music video.

Biography 
Born in Lawrence, Massachusetts, Merrill started playing bass at age fourteen, having traded in his train set for the instrument. Before joining Godsmack, Merrill worked as a self-employed carpenter, a trade likewise pursued by Tony Rombola.

Merrill lives in St. Augustine, Florida, with his wife Heather and three daughters. Although he is righthanded, Merrill plays lefthanded due to a birth defect that renders him unable to move the middle finger of his left hand. He is a pet owner and has a dog name Ciege

Musical style 
Merrill uses Dunlop Clear "D" plastic fingerpicks on his plucking-hand index and ring fingers, which contributes to his distinctive style of play.

Discography

Godsmack
 1998: Godsmack
 2000: Awake
 2003: Faceless
 2004: The Other Side
 2006: IV
 2007: Good Times, Bad Times... Ten Years of Godsmack
 2010: The Oracle
 2012: Live & Inspired
 2014: 1000hp
 2018: When Legends Rise
 2023: Lighting Up The Sky

Another Animal
 2007: Another Animal

Gear 
Bass Spector Euro 4LX-35.
Fretless Spector 4-string D’Addario XL strings tuned DADG or CGCG; Dunlop Clear "D" fingerpicks.
(Up Through the Oracle album)-Rig SWR 750x heads and SWR 4 x 12" 12-STACK cabs.
(Current)-Gallien-Krueger Fusion 550 head, and Gallien-Krueger RBH410 cabs.
Effects Line 6 PODxt (studio), Line 6 Bass PODxt (live).
Aurora Strings.
On the back cover of the April 2010 Bass Player magazine issue, Robbie is now an official Gallien-Krueger user. It shows him with a Fusion 550 amp and a NEO412 cabinet
According to Merrill, when he is in the studio, he runs a Line 6 guitar POD direct for growly, midrangy distortion, and he blends that with miked cabinets."

References

External links

 
 Robbie Merrill bass solo - YouTube
 IMV Trailer: Robbie Merrill, bassist for Godsmack - YouTube

1963 births
Living people
People from Lawrence, Massachusetts
Godsmack members
American bass guitarists
20th-century American guitarists
Another Animal members